

List by the World Bank Group (2020) 
Data of the World Bank Group for 2020. The values in the World Bank Group tables are rounded. All calculations are based on raw data, so due to the nuances of rounding, in some places illusory inconsistencies of indicators arose, with a size of 0.01 year.

List by the World Bank Group (2019) 
Data of the World Bank Group for 2019.

List by World Health Organization (2019) 
Data of the World Health Organization for 2019, published in December 2020.

See also 
 List of countries by life expectancy

References 

world
World